State Route 111 (SR 111), also known as the Carl Broggi Highway, is a  state highway in southern Maine. It runs east–west, connecting the towns of Alfred and Biddeford. It is a major east-west corridor in central York County, Maine.

Route description
SR 111 begins at its junction with U.S. Route 202 (US 202), SR 4, and SR 4A in Alfred, Maine. It travels east along Biddeford Road/Carl Broggi Highway. Outside the Alfred city limits, Biddeford Road becomes "Alfred Road". SR 111 intersects SR 35 at Goodwin Mills Road, then continues into Biddeford crossing Interstate 95 (Maine Turnpike) at exit 32.

SR 111 continues as Alfred Street, the turnpike link into downtown Biddeford. Just prior to entering downtown Biddeford, it intersects US 1, then reaches its eastern terminus at the junction with SR 9/SR 208.

For the majority of its length, SR 111 is a two lane road. However it has recently been widened to four lanes for a short distance between The Shops at Biddeford Crossing and US 1 due to heavier traffic from nearby shopping centers.

History

SR 111's entire distance was once designated as part of the now-defunct New England Interstate Route 11, which traversed from Biddeford to Manchester, Vermont (near the Vermont - New York border).  The road was most likely renamed as Route 111 to commemorate its association with the historic New England Route 11.

Junction list

References

External links

Floodgap Roadgap's RoadsAroundME: Maine State Route 111

111
Transportation in York County, Maine